The architecture of Charleston, the largest city in the US state of South Carolina, has English and Barbadian influences.

Architectural styles

Charleston Single House 

The Charleston single house is the city's most famous architectural style. The house is built with the longer side perpendicular to the street, and normally has a piazza on the south side to take advantage of the prevailing winds.

Tallest buildings 
The zoning requirements of Charleston discourage tall buildings, and folklore states that no building can be taller than the tallest church steeple, which is that of St. Matthew's Lutheran Church. Therefore, Charleston has no skyscrapers by the modern definition, although the first building described as such was the eight-story People's Office Building, completed in 1911.

Bridges 
Charleston has many bridges over the Ashley, Cooper, Stono, and Wando rivers due to the city's peninsular geography. Particularly noteworthy is the Arthur Ravenel Jr. Bridge, which at the time of its construction was the longest cable-stayed bridge in the Western Hemisphere.

Street grid

Board of Architectural Review 
The Board of Architectural Review is a part of the Charleston city government that was created in 1931 to oversee the preservation of buildings in the Charleston Historic District. The city architect oversees the Board. The current city architect is Tory Parish.

References 

Charleston
Buildings and structures in Charleston, South Carolina